Hopea odorata, or ta-khian, is a species of plant in the family Dipterocarpaceae. It is found in Bangladesh, Cambodia, India, Laos, Malaysia, Myanmar, Thailand, and Vietnam. It is a large tree reaching up to 45 m in height with the base of the trunk reaching a diameter of 4.5 m. It grows in forests, preferably near rivers, at altitudes between 0 and 600m. In places such as West Bengal and the Andaman Islands it is often planted as a shade tree. Valued for its wood, it is a threatened species in its natural habitat.

Traditions
In Thailand this tree is believed to be inhabited by a certain tree spirit known as Lady Ta-khian, belonging to a type of ghosts related to trees known generically as Nang Mai (นางไม้).

Gallery

References

External links

Hopea odorata Roxb.
Buddha Magic Thai Beliefs in the Nang Ta-Khian Tree Spirit within Hopea Odorata trees

odorata
Flora of West Bengal
Trees of Bangladesh
Flora of Indo-China
Trees of Peninsular Malaysia
Taxonomy articles created by Polbot